The men's 400 metres was a track and field athletics event held as part of the Athletics at the 1904 Summer Olympics programme.  It was the third time the event was held.  12 athletes from 3 nations participated. The competition was held on August 29, 1904. The event was won by Harry Hillman of the United States, the third time in a row that a different American had won the event. The Americans swept the medals, the first time that feat had been achieved in the men's 400 metres.

Background

This was the third time the event was held. None of the runners from 1900 returned. Harry Hillman of the United States and Percival Molson of Canada were the favorites; Molson had beaten Hillman at the 1904 Canadian championships.

Molson was Canada's first-ever runner in the Olympic men's 400 metres. The United States made its third appearance in the event, the only nation to compete in it at the first three Olympic Games.

Competition format

The competition consisted of a single race with all runners starting together.

Records

These were the standing world and Olympic records (in seconds) prior to the 1904 Summer Olympics.

(*) 440 yards (= 402.34 m)

(**) This track was 500 metres in circumference.

Harry Hillman set a new Olympic record with 49.2 seconds.

Results

Groman took the lead at 70 metres; Hillman, Waller, Poage, and Prinstein formed a group behind him while the other six runners formed a second group further back. Hillman passed Groman at the halfway mark, with Fleming moving up into the first group. Poage attempted to take the lead in the last turn, but Fleming and Waller blocked him and he fell back to the train group before the final sprint. Hillman finished "about three yards" ahead of Waller, with Groman "on Waller's heels" and Fleming and Prinstein "almost together, another two yards back."

Sources

 

Athletics at the 1904 Summer Olympics
400 metres at the Olympics